Hülya Şen (born 29 February 1968) is a Turkish actress. She is a graduate of Dokuz Eylül University with a degree in theatre studies. While finishing her second year in the university, she appeared in movie by Tekin Akmansoy. She made her television debut in 1994, after which she starred in various films and series. She has received multiple national awards.

Filmography

Film

TV series

Theatre

References

External links 
 

Living people
1968 births
Dokuz Eylül University alumni
Turkish television actresses
Turkish stage actresses
Turkish film actresses